The Peasants is a novel written by the Polish author Władysław Reymont in four parts between 1904 and 1909. He started writing it in 1897, but because of a railway accident and health problems, it took seven years to complete. The first parts of the story were published in the weekly magazine Tygodnik Illustrowany. The novel has been translated into at least 27 languages.

Description 
Each of the four parts represents a season in the life of the peasants – Autumn (published in 1904), Winter (published in 1904), Spring (published in 1906), and Summer (published in 1909). This division underlines the relationship of human life with nature.

Analysis 
Reymont decided to write about peasant life because of historical events, which took place in Polish villages in the early 20th century. The fact that the author was brought up in a village has a significant influence on the novel's plot.

In The Peasants, Reymont created a more complete and suggestive picture of country life than any other Polish writer. The novel impresses the reader with its authenticity of the material reality, customs, behaviour and spiritual culture of the people. It is even more authentic in that it is written in the local Łowicz dialect. Not only did Reymont use dialect in dialogues but also in narration, creating a kind of a universal language of Polish peasants. Thanks to this, he presents the colourful reality of the "spoken" culture of the people better than any other author. He set the action of the novel in Lipce, a real village which he came to know during his work on the railway near Skierniewice, and restricted the time of events to ten months in the unspecified "now" of the nineteenth century. It is not history that determines the rhythm of country life, but the "unspecified time" of eternal returns.

The composition of the novel is notable for its strict simplicity and functionality. The titles of the various volumes signal a tetralogy in one vegetational cycle, which regulates the eternal and repeatable rhythm of village life. Parallel to that rhythm is a calendar of religion and customs, also repeatable. In such boundaries Reymont placed a colourful country community with sharply drawn individual portraits. The repertoire of human experience and the richness of spiritual life, which can be compared with the repertoire of Biblical books and Greek myths, has no doctrinal ideas or didactic exemplifications. The author of The Peasants does not believe in doctrines, but rather in his own knowledge of life, the mentality of the people described, and his sense of reality. It is easy to point to moments of Naturalism (e.g. some erotic elements) or to illustrative motives characteristic of Symbolism. It is equally easy to prove the Realistic values of the novel. None of the "isms" however, would be enough to describe it.

Main characters 
 Maciej Boryna – the richest man in the village and the main character of the novel.
 Antek Boryna – Maciej's son, husband of Hanka
 Hanka Boryna – Antek's wife and a mother of three children
 Jagna – a beautiful 19-year-old girl and the main female character of the novel.

Main themes and events 
 The conflict between Antek and his father which is connected with a piece of land and a beautiful woman – Jagna.
 Hanka's struggle to salvage her marriage and family.
 The poignant story of the farmhand – Jakub.
 The unrest sown by Jagna's variable attentions toward assorted men of the village. 
 The tension between the peasants and the nobility, over the disputed sale of the peasants' forest.
 The patterns of the peasants' lives closely tracking the seasons.
 The beggar Old Agata and her transit into and out of the village corresponding with the passage of the seasons and the tenacity of life.

Customs and traditions 
The Peasants deals not only with the everyday life of people, but also with traditions connected with the most important Polish festivals.

1. Traditions connected with wedding and marriage:
 preparation for a wedding and a marriage
 decoration of a dance-hall
 the cutting of a bride's hair (symbolic of starting a new life)
 the first dance during a wedding is dedicated to bride
 wedding games etc.
2. Traditions connected with Christmas:
 baking cakes, cooking Christmas meals
 selling of holy wafer by carol singers
 Christmas supper
 going to the church for midnight mass
3. Traditions connected with Easter:
 breaking of Lenten fast
 dying eggs
 “wet Monday”
4. Traditions connected with everyday life:
 pickling of cabbage
 spinning of wool
 following of folk wisdom to plant agricultural crops

Art movements included in the novel 
Impressionism - a style in painting developed in France in the late 19th century that uses colour to show the effects of light on things and to suggest atmosphere rather than showing exact details.  In the book we can find impressionism in the descriptions of nature.

Naturalism - a style of art or writing that shows people, things and experiences as they really are. In the book naturalism is used to present everyday life. The most famous fragment of the book when naturalism is shown is when Jakub – the farmhand - is cutting his leg.

Realism - a style in art or literature that shows things and people as they are in real life (detailed descriptions of nature, traditions, everyday life and heroes).

Symbolism - the use of symbols to represent ideas, especially in art and literature (the scene of the Maciej's death, which symbolises a strong relationship between people and nature).

English translations
The novel was first translated into English by Michael Henry Dziewicki and published in 1924.

A new English translation, by Anna Zaranko, was published in November 2022.

Film and television adaptations 
A film was made of the novel (directed by Eugeniusz Modzelewski) in 1922, as well as a television mini-series in 1972 (directed by Jan Rybkowski).

It was announced that an animated film based on the novel is set to be released in 2022 with a full trailer revealed. The movie is directed by Dorota Kobiela and, much like her previous film Loving Vincent, the film is entirely rotoscoped with paintings.

References

External links
Critical Essay by Per Hallström, Chairman of the Nobel Committee of the Swedish Academy
Profile of Reymont

Polish novels
1904 novels
Works originally published in Polish newspapers
Novels first published in serial form
Novels set in Poland
20th-century Polish novels
Polish novels adapted into films